SWU may refer to:

Science & technology
Separative Work Unit, the amount of separation done by an enrichment process

Labor Unions
Seychelles Workers Union
Starbucks Workers Union

Universities
South-West University "Neofit Rilski" (Blagoevgrad, Bulgaria)
Southwest University (Chongqing, China)
Srinakharinwirot University (Bangkok, Thailand)
Seoul Women's University
Showa Women's University (Tokyo, Japan)
Southern Wesleyan University
Southwestern University (Philippines)

Miscellaneous
StandWithUs, pro-Israel organization
SWU Swimwear, Australian online retailer
Star Wars universe
SWU Music & Arts, Brazilian music festival
Swiss European Air Lines (ICAO airline designator)